In linear algebra, given a vector space V with a basis B of vectors indexed by an index set I (the cardinality of I is the dimension of V), the dual set of B is a set B∗ of vectors in the dual space V∗ with the same index set I such that B and B∗ form a biorthogonal system. The dual set is always linearly independent but does not necessarily span V∗. If it does span V∗, then B∗ is called the dual basis or reciprocal basis for the basis B.

Symbolically, evaluating a dual vector in V∗ on a vector in the original space V:

where  is the Kronecker delta symbol.

Introduction
To perform operations with a vector, we must have a straightforward method of calculating its components. In a Cartesian frame the necessary operation is the dot product of the vector and the base vector. E.g.,

 

where  is the bases in a Cartesian frame. The components of  can be found by

 

In a non-Cartesian frame, we do not necessarily have ei ·  for all . However, it is always possible to find a vector ei such that

 

The equality holds when ei is the dual base of ei. Notice the difference in position of the index i.

In a Cartesian frame, we have

Existence and uniqueness
The dual set always exists and gives an injection from V into V∗, namely the mapping that sends vi to vi. This says, in particular, that the dual space has dimension greater or equal to that of V.

However, the dual set of an infinite-dimensional V does not span its dual space V∗. This map is clearly nonzero on all vi. If w were a finite linear combination of the dual basis vectors vi, say  for a finite subset K of I, then for any j not in K, contradicting the definition of w. So, this w does not lie in the span of the dual set.

The dual of an infinite-dimensional space has greater dimensionality (this being a greater infinite cardinality) than the original space has, and thus these cannot have a basis with the same indexing set. However, a dual set of vectors exists, which defines a subspace of the dual isomorphic to the original space. Further, for topological vector spaces, a continuous dual space can be defined, in which case a dual basis may exist.

Finite-dimensional vector spaces

In the case of finite-dimensional vector spaces, the dual set is always a dual basis and it is unique. If one denotes the evaluation of a covector on a vector as a pairing, the biorthogonality condition becomes:

The association of a dual basis with a basis gives a map from the space of bases of V to the space of bases of V∗, and this is also an isomorphism. For topological fields such as the real numbers, the space of duals is a topological space, and this gives a homeomorphism between the Stiefel manifolds of bases of these spaces.

A categorical and algebraic construction of the dual space

Another way to introduce the dual space of a vector space (module) is by introducing it in a categorical sense. To do this, let  be a module defined over the ring  (that is,  is an object in the category ).

To formally construct a basis for the dual space, we shall now restrict our view to the case where  is a finite-dimensional free (left) -module, where  is a ring with unity. From here, we define the Kronecker Delta function  over the basis  by  if  and  if . Then the set  describes a linearly independent set with each . Since  is finite-dimensional, the basis  is of finite cardinality.

Examples
For example, the standard basis vectors of R2 (the Cartesian plane) are

and the standard basis vectors of its dual space R2* are

In 3-dimensional Euclidean space, for a given basis {e1, e2, e3}, the biorthogonal (dual) basis {e1, e2, e3} can be found by formulas below:

where  denotes the transpose and

is the volume of the parallelepiped formed by the basis vectors  and 

In general the dual basis of a basis in a finite-dimensional vector space can be readily computed as follows: given the basis  and corresponding dual basis  we can build matrices

Then the defining property of the dual basis states that

Hence the matrix for the dual basis  can be computed as

See also

 Reciprocal lattice
 Miller index
 Zone axis

Notes

References
 
 

Linear algebra

he:מרחב דואלי#הבסיס הדואלי
zh:对偶基